The Pete Dye Golf Club is an 18-hole facility in Harrison County, just northwest of Bridgeport, West Virginia. It features 7,308 yards of golf from the longest tees for a par of 72. The course rating is 76.9 and it has a slope rating of 147.  Designed by Pete Dye, ASGCA, the Pete Dye golf course opened in 1995. Tony Kowalski manages the course as the General Manager.

Awards
 #1 – Best Course in West Virginia according to Golf Digest
 #10 – America's Best Modern Courses according to Golf Week
 #42 – Top 50 Private Retreats according to Golf Digest
 #74 – Top 100 Courses in the U.S. according to Golf Magazine
 #45 – America's 100 Greatest Golf Courses according to Golf Digest

References

External links
 Pete Dye Golf Club
  Golf Link review
  Epionions Review of Pete Dye Golf Club

Golf clubs and courses in West Virginia
Golf clubs and courses designed by Pete Dye
Buildings and structures in Harrison County, West Virginia
Bridgeport, West Virginia
1995 establishments in West Virginia